The Helen Birch Bartlett Memorial Collection is an art collection held by the Art Institute of Chicago. It is based on a collection assembled by Helen Louise Birch and her husband, Frederic Clay Bartlett.

Birch and Bartlett
Also in attendance was Mrs. Marshall Field, Sr., the former Delia Spencer, who was Catherine's aunt and Helen's cousin. The Bartletts were a dynamic couple, both from like upbringings, they had similar interests and played off each other's strengths. They were a fixture of Chicago’s civic-minded elite during the early 1900s. Prior to their marriage, Frederic's art collection focused on a variety of sources, including antique, Renaissance, and 19th-century fine and decorative arts. Bartlett was himself a talented artist and muralist.

Collecting
In the early 1920s, their collecting activities became more focused. Leading a cosmopolitan lifestyle, the couple traveled regularly to Europe, where they acquired a collection of modern art. Concentrating on the contemporary French avant-garde, they purchased works by André Derain, André Dunoyer de Segonzac, André Lhôte, and Amedeo Modigliani.

In the spring of 1923, they acquired Henri Matisse’s, Woman Before an Aquarium. The following year, less than one year after Frederic succeeded his father, Adolphus Clay Bartlett, as a trustee of the Art Institute of Chicago, they acquired Georges Seurat’s, Sunday Afternoon on the Island of La Grande Jatte. This purchase was made specifically with the museum in mind, at a time when the Seurat was not yet represented in any American or French public collection. Over the next several years, with the intention of placing La Grande Jatte in an appropriate artistic context, the Bartletts purchased major paintings by key Post-Impressionist artists Paul Cézanne, Paul Gauguin, Vincent van Gogh, and Henri de Toulouse-Lautrec, as well as important works by other modern masters, such as Pablo Picasso and Henri Rousseau.

Memorial collection

After only six-and-one-half years of marriage, Helen Birch Bartlett died of cancer on October 24, 1925.  To honor his wife, Frederic presented their unique art collection to the Art Institute of Chicago in May 1926.  The Helen Birch Memorial Collection has been permanently displayed in the museum continuously since the donation.  During the 1920s and 30s, Bartlett would swap-out paintings in order to add pieces that would be a better representation or example of the work displayed.  The twenty-five paintings in the collection are still in the public gallery as well as other works from the same historical time-frame.

Works of art in the collection include:

References 

Art collections in the United States
Former private collections in the United States